Alexander Mills, North Carolina, was a town in Rutherford County, North Carolina, in the USA. It was incorporated in 1925 and named after a textile mill established by J.F. Alexander. In 1999, Alexander Mills merged with and became a part of Forest City, North Carolina.

Sources

The North Carolina Gazetteer, A Dictionary of Tar Heel Places, by William S. Powell

Geography of Rutherford County, North Carolina
Annexed places in North Carolina
Former municipalities in North Carolina
Populated places disestablished in 1999